Raj Bahadur Singh (born 29 December 1967) is an Indian politician and member of the 17th Lok Sabha, representing Sagar constituency, Madhya Pradesh. He was born in Sagar and is a member of the Bharatiya Janata Party.

References 

India MPs 2019–present
Lok Sabha members from Madhya Pradesh
Living people
Bharatiya Janata Party politicians from Madhya Pradesh
People from Sagar, Madhya Pradesh
1967 births